Alois Estermann  (October 29, 1954 – May 4, 1998) was a senior officer of the Pontifical Swiss Guard who was murdered in his apartment in Vatican City.

Early life
Estermann was born in Gunzwil, in the Canton of Lucerne. He grew up as a member of a farming family living near Beromünster. In 1975 he graduated with a degree in commerce from a business school in Lucerne.

Career
From 1975 through 1976, Estermann attended the officer training school for the Swiss Army at Thun. He subsequently reached the rank of lieutenant as a Swiss reserve officer. In 1977 Estermann served briefly in the Pontifical Swiss Guard at the Vatican. He then lived in Argentina for two years. In July 1980 he rejoined the Swiss Guard as an officer, thereafter receiving promotions to Major (1983) and then to Lieutenant Colonel (1987). In 1988 he was appointed Commander of the Swiss Guard.

Death
According to official Vatican statements, Estermann and his Venezuelan wife, Gladys Meza Romero, were killed on 4 May 1998 by a young Swiss Guard Vice Corporal Cédric Tornay, who then committed suicide. Estermann, formerly Acting Commander of the Swiss Guard, had been confirmed in his position the same day. Tornay had earlier been reprimanded for breaches of discipline and had been passed over for a medal routinely awarded to Guards after three years of service. A note written by Tornay shortly before the murder indicates that he regarded Estermann as a harsh martinet with a personal bias against the Vice Corporal.   

Pope John Paul II personally celebrated Estermann's Funeral Mass in the church of Saints Martin and Sebastian.

Conspiracy theories
The high-profile homicide gave rise to various speculative theories over the following years.

The conspiracy allegation originates with Bugie di sangue in Vaticano (1999), written by "a group of Vatican ecclesiastics and lays who cannot continue to avail, with their silence, official truth told by the Vatican". This document suggests that Estermann   was killed in the course of a supposed struggle between the Opus Dei and masonic parties  within the Vatican hierarchy, both attempting to annex the Swiss guard.

According to a piece edited by Fabio Croce, the three were all murdered by "a Vatican killer", due to Estermann's supposed knowledge of the small state's trafficks. In his 2008 book Poteri forti, Ferruccio Pinotti asserts that Estermann repeatedly travelled to Poland in 1981 to coordinate the arrival of military equipment from Scandinavia to support the Polish anti-communist organization Solidarity.

A competing hypothesis was published in L'Agent secret du Vatican (2004), by journalist Victor Guitard and Markus Wolf, former No. 2 of the East German secret police Stasi. These authors declared that Estermann had been a Stasi agent since 1979.

British journalist John Follain undertook extensive interviews to inform his book, City of Secrets: The Truth behind the murders at the Vatican (2006). Follain dismisses speculation that Estermann, his wife, and Tornay were murdered by an external fourth party or that Estermann was a spy for the former East German government. Follain's research indicated that Cédric Tornay did indeed kill his commander and the commander's wife before turning the gun on himself. Reportedly Tornay found the running of the Swiss Guard archaic, and resented the dominance of the Swiss German majority contingent. According to Follain, Tornay turned to Alois Estermann for affection and the two had a short homosexual affair, but their relationship deteriorated into acrimony as Tornay realised that Estermann had betrayed him with another guard. Estermann's close links to the Opus Dei movement, and his final refusal to award the Benemerenti medal for three years' service led to further frustration and Tornay's ultimate decision to kill Estermann, according to Follain.

In a 2011 history of the modern Vatican's military and police forces, Professor David Alvarez, of the Department of Politics at St. Mary's College of California, summarizes the various conspiracy theories before concluding that they "either remain unsubstantiated or have been thoroughly discredited".

Bibliography 
 Fabio Croce. Delitto in Vaticano: La verità, F. Croce Editore, 1999.
 Discepoli di Verità. Bugie di sangue in Vaticano, Kaos, 2002.
 John Follain. City of Secrets: The Truth behind the murders at the Vatican, Harper Collins, London, 2006.
 Victor Guitard. L'Agent secret du Vatican, Albin Michel, Paris, 2004. .
 I Millenari. Via col vento in Vaticano, Aufbau, Berlin, 2002. .
 Hanspeter Oschwald. Vatikan, die Firma Gottes, Piper, 1998. .
 Ferruccio Pinotti. Poteri Forti, Biblioteca Univerzale Rizzoli, 2008.
 Thomas J. Reese. Im Inneren des Vatikan. Politik und Organisation der katholischen Kirche, Fischer, 2000. .
 Jacques Vergès & Luc Brossollet. Assassinati in Vaticano, Kaos, 2002.
 Valeska von Rogues. Mord im Vatikan. Ermittlungen gegen die katholische Kirche, DTV, 2005. .

Notes

1954 births
1998 deaths
Swiss Roman Catholics
Assassinated Swiss people
Swiss people murdered abroad
People murdered in Vatican City
Commanders of the Swiss Guard
Conspiracy theories in Europe
Swiss military officers
Male murder victims